Jill Kelly or Gillian Kelly may refer to:
Jill Kelly (actress) (born 1971), American pornographic actress

See also
Jill Kelley (born 1975), American socialite and volunteer military liaison